Mexico competed at the 1964 Summer Olympics in Tokyo, Japan. 94 competitors, 90 men and 4 women, took part in 58 events in 15 sports. As the country hosted the next Olympics in Mexico City, the flag of Mexico was raised at the closing ceremony.

Medalists

Bronze
 Juan Fabila — Boxing, Men's Bantamweight

Athletics

Basketball

Boxing

Cycling

Nine cyclists represented Mexico in 1964.

Individual road race
 Melesio Soto
 Francisco Coronel
 Heriberto Díaz
 Moises López

Team time trial
 Adolfo Belmonte
 Antonio Duque
 Moises López
 Porfirio Remigio

Sprint
 José Luis Tellez
 José Mercado

1000m time trial
 José Mercado

Tandem
 José Mercado
 José Luis Tellez

Individual pursuit
 Antonio Duque

Diving

Equestrian

Football

Judo

Modern pentathlon

four male pentathletes represented Mexico in 1964.

Individual
 David Bárcena
 Eduardo Florez
 Enrique Padilla
 Enriquez Andrade
Team
 David Bárcena
 Eduardo Florez
 Enrique Padilla
 Enriquez Andrade

Rowing

Sailing

Shooting

Five shooters represented Mexico in 1964.

50 m pistol
 Enrique Torres
 Raúl Ibarra

50 m rifle, three positions
 Olegario Vázquez
 Abel Vázquez

50 m rifle, prone
 Jesús Elizondo
 Olegario Vázquez

Swimming

Weightlifting

Wrestling

References

External links
Official Olympic Reports
International Olympic Committee results database

Nations at the 1964 Summer Olympics
1964
1964 in Mexican sports